Sir William Parsons, 4th Baronet of Birr Castle (6 May 1731 – 1 May 1791) was an Irish politician and baronet.

He was the son of Sir Laurence Parsons, 3rd Baronet and Mary Sprigge. From 1757 until his death in 1797, Parsons served as member of parliament (MP) in the Irish House of Commons for King's County. He was High Sheriff of King's County in 1779.

Marriage and children
He married Mary Clere, daughter of John Clere, on 28 June 1754.
 Laurence Parsons, 2nd Earl of Rosse (21 May 1758 – 24 February 1841)
 John Clere Parsons (born 1760)
 Reverend William Parsons (1764–1838)
 Thomas Clere Parsons (1766–1825)

References
 

1731 births
1791 deaths
Baronets in the Baronetage of Ireland
Irish MPs 1727–1760
Irish MPs 1761–1768
Irish MPs 1769–1776
Irish MPs 1776–1783
Irish MPs 1783–1790
Irish MPs 1790–1797
Members of the Parliament of Ireland (pre-1801) for King's County constituencies
High Sheriffs of King's County